Meriandra is a genus of plants in the family Lamiaceae. It is native to eastern Africa, the Arabian Peninsula, and India.

Species
 Meriandra dianthera (Roth ex Roem. & Schult.) Briq. in H.G.A.Engler & K.A.E.Prantl - Ethiopia, Eritrea, Saudi Arabia, Yemen, India
 Meriandra strobilifera Benth. - western Himalayas of northern India

References

Lamiaceae
Lamiaceae genera